Bedrich Benes (born November 10, 1967) is a computer scientist and a researcher in computer graphics.

Academic positions 
He is a professor of computer science at Purdue University. He was a member of numerous program committees of various conferences including ACM SIGGRAPH and Eurographics and he was a papers chair of Eurographics 2017. He was editor in chief of Computer Graphics Forum  (2018-2021). He is associate editor of Computers & Graphics.,  IEEE Transactions on Games, and
In Silico Plants. He worked at Purdue Computer Graphics Technology from 2005-2021, where he held a named professorship (George W. McNelly Professor of Technology in 2019-2021). He is known for his work in geometric modeling, procedural modeling, scientific visualization, and software optimizations in digital manufacturing.

Education
Benes received his Ph.D. in 1998 from Czech Technical University where he studied computer science and computer graphics and his M.S. degree in 1991 from the same institution in the same fields.

Honors and awards
2022 Eurographics Fellow 
2020 Elsevier Computers & Graphics Associate Editor of the Year 2020
2019 - 2022 Purdue University George W. McNelly Professor of Technology 
2019 Association for Computing Machinery (ACM) Senior Member
2018-2021 Computer Graphics Forum Editor in Chief
2017 Institute of Electrical and Electronics Engineers (IEEE) Senior Member
2017 Eurographics Annual Conference - honorable mention from the Best Papers Committee for the paper " Interactive Modeling and Authoring of Climbing Plants"
2017 Eurographics Annual Conference Papers Chair
2012 Purdue University Outstanding Award in Discovery
2011 Purdue University Faculty Scholar
2011 Purdue University Outstanding Award in Discovery
2009 Purdue University Early Faculty Discovery Award
2005 Outstanding faculty award in discovery and technical development (Premio Rómulo Garza) of Monterrey Institute of Technology and Higher Education

Books
Jiri Zara, Bedrich Benes, Jiri Sochor, Petr Felkel (1998) "Moderní počítačová grafika" (Computer press)
George Bebis, Richard Boyle, Bahram Parvin, Darko Koracin, Song Wang, Kim Kyungnam, Bedrich Benes, Stephen DiVerdi, Kenneth Moreland, Chiang Yi-Jen, Christoph Borst and Jiang Ming editors (2006) "Advances in Visual Computing: 7th International Symposium", Springer-Verlag Lecture Notes in Computer Science

Selected works
Guo, J., Jiang, H., Benes, B., Deussen, O., Zhang, X., Lischinski, D., & Huang, H. (2020). Inverse Procedural Modeling of Branching Structures by Inferring L-Systems. ACM Transactions on Graphics (TOG) PDF
Benes, B., Guan, K., Lang, M., Long, S. P., Lynch, J. P., Marshall‐Colón, A., Bin, P., Schnable, J., Sweetlove, L.J., & Turk, M. J. (2020). Multiscale computational models can guide experimentation and targeted measurements for crop improvement. The Plant Journal PDF
Graciano, A., Rueda-Ruiz, A. J., Pospisil, A., Bittner, J., & Benes, B. (2020). QuadStack: An Efficient Representation and Direct Rendering of Layered Datasets. IEEE Transactions on Visualization and Computer Graphics PDF
Kang, H., Li, H., Zhang, J., Lu, X., & Benes, B. (2018). Flycam: Multitouch gesture controlled drone gimbal photography. IEEE Robotics and Automation Letters, 3(4), 3717-3724 PDF
Hädrich, T., Benes, B., Deussen, O., and Pirk, S (2017) Interactive Modeling and Authoring of Climbing Plants in Computer Graphics Forum (Eurographics 2017 - honorable mention from the Best Papers Committee)
Gen Nishida, Ignacio Garcia-Dorado, Daniel G Aliaga, Bedrich Benes and Adrien Bousseau (2016) "Interactive sketching of urban procedural models" in ACM Transactions on Graphics (TOG) PDF
Soren Pirk, Ondrej Stava, Julian Kratt, Michel Abdul Massih Said, Boris Neubert, Radomir Mech, Bedrich Benes and Oliver Deussen (2012), "Plastic trees: interactive self-adapting botanical tree models" in ACM Transactions on Graphics PDF
Ondrej Stava, Juraj Vanek, Bedrich Benes, Nathan Carr and Radomir Mech (2012), "Stress relief: improving structural strength of 3D printable objects", in ACM Transactions on Graphics (TOG) 31(4) PDF
Carlos A Vanegas, Daniel G Aliaga, Bedrich Benes (2010), "Building reconstruction using manhattan-world grammars" IEEE Conference on Computer Vision and Pattern Recognition (CVPR), PDF
Ondrej Stava, Bedrich Benes, Radomir Mech, Daniel G Aliaga, and Peter Kristof (2010), "Inverse Procedural Modeling by Automatic Generation of L-systems" in Computer Graphics Forum PDF
Peter Kristof, Bedrich Benes, Jan Krivanek and Ondrej Stava (2009), "Hydraulic erosion using smoothed particle hydrodynamics", in Computer Graphics Forum PDF
Christopher Hartman and Bedrich Benes (2006), "Autonomous Boids" in Computer Animation and Virtual Worlds PDF
Bedrich Benes and Rafael Forsbach (2001), "Layered data representation for visual simulation of terrain erosion", in Spring Conference on Computer Graphics (IEEE), PDF from Purdue University

In the news
Crop Modeling Project Awarded $5M (2019)
Drone navigation and photography simplified by Purdue grad student and professor (2018)
From Terminator to household tech: Researchers work to add function to 3D-printed objects (2018)
New Automation Revolutionizes 120 year old grading process Purdue News (2017)
Teaching machines to pinpoint earthquake damage Purdue News (2017)
New 3-D printing algorithms speed production, reduce waste Purdue News (2014)
3-D printing software helps designers avoid rookie mistakes Scientific American (2012)
Study maps greenhouse gas emissions to building, street level for U.S. cities ASU News (2012)
Seeing a City's CO2 Emissions, Block by Block in  Popular Mechanics (2012)

References

External links
Bedrich Benes at Purdue University 
Bedrich Benes at Purdue University
Bedrich Benes publications and citations on Google Scholar, Orcid,Scopus, and Research Gate
Bedrich Benes Visualization of Climate change: Track urban emissions on a human scale in Nature

Czech scientists
Living people
Czech computer scientists
Purdue University faculty
1967 births
People from Most (city)